On 16 February 2021, A bus carrying about 62 people, driving from Sidhi to Satna, crashed into a canal, located near the city of Satna. It fell into the canal after the driver lost control over it. At least 51 people died in the accident, either from the initial crash, or from drowning and seven were rescued after the bus fell near Patna village in Sidhi district of Madhya Pradesh, India.

References 

2021 disasters in India
2021 road incidents
2020s in Madhya Pradesh
2020s road incidents in Asia
Bus incidents in India
Disasters in Madhya Pradesh
2021 bus accident